There are 13 lakes of at least  within the borders of Minneapolis in the U.S. state of Minnesota. Ryan Lake, in the city's north, sits partially in Minneapolis and partially in neighboring Robbinsdale. Certain other bodies of water are counted on some lists of Minneapolitan lakes, though they may fall outside the city limits or cover fewer than five acres.

Many of Minneapolis's lakes formed in the depressions left by large blocks of ice after the retreat of the Laurentide Ice Sheet at the end of the last glacial period and now overlie sandy or loamy soils. Before the appearance of white settlers, the Dakota harvested wild rice from the lakes. In the early 1800s, the lakes' shorelines were marshy, deterring large-scale settlement and development by white residents though an experimental Dakota agricultural community, Ḣeyate Otuŋwe, was founded on the banks of Bde Maka Ska by Maḣpiya Wic̣aṡṭa in 1829. In the 1880s, landscape architect Horace Cleveland foresaw Minneapolis's growth and made a series of recommendations to the city's Board of Park Commissioners to acquire land along Minnehaha Creek, near Minnehaha Falls, and around several lakes in the southwest portion of the city in order to form a robust, interconnected park system that would aesthetically and morally benefit the city's residents. Board president Charles M. Loring heeded Cleveland's advice and bought the land, later developed into a robust system of parks by Theodore Wirth. During this time, many of the lakes were reformed by the Board of Park Commissioners through draining, dredging, shoreline stabilization, and the construction of parkways around their perimeters. Property in neighborhoods surrounding the lakes grew desirable, especially by the "Chain of Lakes", five lakes in the southwestern portion of the city (Maka Ska, Harriet, Isles, Cedar, and Brownie) that were joined by artificial channels.

Various municipal symbols and icons reference the presence of the lakes in Minneapolitan life and culture, from the sailboat in the city's logo to the ship's wheel on its flag to Minneapolis's nickname, the "City of Lakes". Much of Minneapolis's lakeshore is public parkland, in contrast to other American cities where lakeside property tends to be privately controlled. Since they were dredged, the lakes have drawn city residents for recreation and sport including swimming, sailing, yachting, canoeing, biking, jogging, and ice skating. The  Grand Rounds National Scenic Byway passes around many of Minneapolis's lakes.

List of lakes

Other bodies of water

Some sources, including the City of Minneapolis's own geographic information system (GIS) dataset, list up to 22 lakes within the city. The dataset lists three lakes that are not within the city's borders:
Mother Lake
Wirth Lake
Taft Lake
The list includes some bodies of water smaller than five acres:
 Birch Lake
 Spring Lake
 Lake Mead
 Legion Lake
The Minneapolis GIS dataset includes two of the channels between larger bodies of water as "lakes":
 Cedar–Isles Channel
 Maka Ska–Isles Channel
Additionally, there are 46 ponds in Minneapolis.

See also

 List of lakes in Minnesota
 Trails in Minneapolis

Notes

References

 
Minnesota geography-related lists